Raymond Logan (born 20 September 1978) is a Scottish footballer who played  'senior' for East Fife, Ayr United and Dumbarton.

Logan had a spell at Linlithgow Rose in 2000-2001.

References

1978 births
Scottish footballers
Dumbarton F.C. players
Ayr United F.C. players
East Fife F.C. players
Linlithgow Rose F.C. players
Scottish Football League players
Living people
Association football midfielders